Michael Graves (born 1984) is an American poker player and a medical student at the University of Texas-Southwestern. In 2007, he won a World Series of Poker bracelet in the $1,000 no limit Texas hold'em with rebuys.  His victory created a buzz during the 2007 WSOP as this was the first time he cashed at the WSOP.

As of 2010, Graves live tournament winning exceed $750,000.

World Series of Poker bracelets

References

External links 
 Pokerlistings.com interview of Michael Graves

Grave, Michael
Living people
World Series of Poker bracelet winners
1984 births